Negage is a town and municipality (município) of the Uíge province in Angola. The municipality had a population of 137,559 in 2014. It is served by Negage Airport.

The city is crossed by the Cauã River. The soil is arable and the area is noted for coffee production. It has a mission of Capuchin priests, a church dating from the 1970s, and  two soccer fields located in the neighborhood of Capopa. It has a hospital and clinic space for more than 40 beds, and provided housing for clinicians, doctors and nurses within the hospital perimeter.

References

Populated places in Uíge Province
Municipalities of Angola